Seth Shepard (April 23, 1847 – December 3, 1917) was an Associate Justice and Chief Justice of the Court of Appeals of the District of Columbia.

Education and career

Born in Brenham, Texas, Shepard was a private in the Confederate States Army from 1864 to 1865. He received a Bachelor of Laws from Washington College (now Washington and Lee University School of Law) in 1868 and entered private practice in Brenham. He was a member of the Texas Senate from 1874 to 1875, thereafter returning to private practice in Galveston, Texas until 1886, and then in Dallas, Texas from 1886 to 1893.

Federal judicial service

Shepard was nominated by President Grover Cleveland on April 14, 1893, to the Court of Appeals of the District of Columbia (now the United States Court of Appeals for the District of Columbia Circuit), to a new Associate Justice seat authorized by 27 Stat. 434. He was confirmed by the United States Senate on April 15, 1893, and received his commission the same day. His service terminated on January 19, 1905, due to his elevation to be Chief Justice of the same court.

Shepard was nominated by President Theodore Roosevelt on December 16, 1904, to the Chief Justice seat on the Court of Appeals for the District of Columbia (now the United States Court of Appeals for the District of Columbia Circuit) vacated by Chief Justice Richard H. Alvey. He was confirmed by the Senate on January 5, 1905, and received his commission the same day. His service terminated on September 30, 1917, due to his retirement.

Other service

Concurrent with his federal judicial service, Shepard was a lecturer in law at Georgetown University from 1895 to 1910.

Death

Shepard died on December 3, 1917, in Washington, D.C.

References

Sources
 
 

1847 births
1917 deaths
Texas state senators
Judges of the United States Court of Appeals for the D.C. Circuit
United States federal judges appointed by Grover Cleveland
19th-century American judges
United States court of appeals judges appointed by Theodore Roosevelt
20th-century American judges
Confederate States Army soldiers
19th-century American politicians